Setouchi Aonagi, also Setouchi Retreat Aonagi (瀬戸内リトリート青凪), is a Japanese hotel based in Matsuyama, Ehime Prefecture, Japan. It was opened in 2015 winter. The building was designed by Tadao Ando, a Japanese architect, in the final years of the Japan bubble era. The hotel was designed as a museum at the beginning.

Design 

There are 2 buildings in the hotel.

Most of the space is constructed as hotel rooms now. There are 7 rooms in the hotel, the smallest room is 106.2 m2 and the largest is 169.6 m2.

There are 2 pools in the hotel. One of those is on the rooftop which is a infinity pool facing Seto Inland Sea. The rooftop pool was designed as a concrete-framed lap pool by Tadao Ando

Since the buildings were a museum before, It also has art galleries and many art pieces. The dining room is also inside one of the art galleries and facing a Japanese garden.

Management 
The hotel is now managed by a Japanese hotel management company, onkochishin. inc（株式会社温故知新）.

Award 
Five Red Pavilions in “MICHELIN GUIDE HIROSHIMA EHIME 2018”

References

Hotels in Ehime Prefecture